The grey-headed greenbul (Phyllastrephus poliocephalus), or grey-headed yellow-bellied greenbul, is a species of songbird in the bulbul family, Pycnonotidae. It is found in the Cameroonian Highlands forests.

Its natural habitats are subtropical or tropical moist lowland forests and subtropical or tropical moist montane forests. It is becoming rare due to habitat loss.

Taxonomy and systematics
The grey-headed greenbul was originally described in the genus Xenocichla (a synonym for Bleda). Other alternate names for the grey-headed greenbul include the yellow-bellied bulbul and yellow-bellied greenbul, although these names usually refer to the species of the same names (Alophoixus phaeocephalus and Chlorocichla flaviventris).

References

grey-headed greenbul
Birds of Central Africa
Fauna of Cameroon
grey-headed greenbul
Taxonomy articles created by Polbot